The 2013–14 season was Dunfermline Athletic's first season back in the Scottish Second Division since 1986, having been relegated from the Scottish First Division at the end of the 2012–13 season. Dunfermline Athletic also competed in the Challenge Cup, League Cup and the Scottish Cup.

Results & fixtures

Pre season

Scottish League One

Scottish Championship play-offs

Scottish Challenge Cup

Scottish League Cup

Scottish Cup

Players

Captains

Squad information
Last updated 2 August 2016

|}

Disciplinary record

Club statistics

League table

Results by round

Results summary

Awards

Transfers

Players in

Players out

Loan in

Loans out

References

Dunfermline Athletic F.C. seasons
Dunfermline Athletic